KLAK (97.5 FM) is a radio station licensed to Tom Bean, Texas, serving the Texoma region and the northeast portions of the Dallas–Fort Worth metroplex. The station broadcasts an adult contemporary format, with current-day music and re-currents within the station's playlist. The station's studios are located in McKinney, Texas, with its transmitter southeast of Tom Bean.

History
KLAK started broadcasting on the 104.9 FM frequency on October 17, 1983, licensed to Denison, Texas, as a soft adult contemporary format branded as K-LAKE 105. It moved to its present 97.5 FM frequency on May 12, 1987, and was renamed as 97.5 K-LAKE FM. The station rebranded as 97.5 KLAK in 2006.

In November 2016, KLAK expanded towards a variety hits format with the addition of more Hot AC songs. Four years later, KLAK gradually evolved to Hot AC full-time. This lasted for almost two years until August 30, 2022, when the station began stunting with station identifications and TM Studios jingles with the background of radio static for a short time, which led to the station's return to its "K-Lake" name and normal adult contemporary format.

Programming 
Besides music, KLAK's programming consists of talk shows (through Westwood One) and sports. The Sandy Show broadcasts every weekday morning at 5am-9am while Alan Freemont broadcasts at 2pm-6pm weekdays. KLAK airs McKinney ISD high school football broadcasts on Thursday and Friday evenings during the high school football season.

References

External links
KLAK official website
DFW Radio/TV History

Mainstream adult contemporary radio stations in the United States
LAK
Radio stations established in 1983
Alpha Media radio stations